Southchurch is an inner city area of the city of Southend-on-Sea, in the City of Southend-on-Sea, in the ceremonial county of Essex, England. England. In 1911 the parish had a population of 3954.

History
In 824 AD, a Saxon thegn, Leofstan presented the manor of Southchurch to the monks of Canterbury. It is possible that the church from which the manor takes its name already existed beforehand. The name "Southchurch" originates from a Saxon church which was south of a pre-Norman minster. On 9 November 1913 the parish was abolished to form "Southend on Sea".

Location 
Southchurch is bounded by Southchurch Avenue to the west (beyond which is central Southend-on-Sea), Thorpe Hall Boulevard to the east (beyond which is Thorpe Bay), Southchurch Road and Southchurch Boulevard to the north (beyond which is Bournes Green) and Eastern Esplanade to the south (which runs along the north bank of the River Thames). Principal roads include Southchurch Road, Southchurch Boulevard, Woodgrange Drive, Ambleside Drive, Wyatts Drive and Lifstan Way.

Housing
The current local housing stock mainly dates from the first half of the twentieth century, when Southchurch expanded from a village into the residential district of Southend. To the south of the station is Southchurch Hall, a thirteenth-century moated manor house. This is now open to the public as a museum, which stands in a small park: Southchurch Hall Gardens.

Schools
Futures College, Southend High School for Girls (grammar), Greenways primary school, Hamstel Road primary school and Porters Grange primary school are situated within the boundaries of Southchurch.

Churches
Holy Trinity Church is the original parish church of Southchurch. The oldest parts of this church date back to the Saxon era, with later additions in the early 20th century. Christ Church (Church of England) is in Colbert Avenue, just to the east of Southchurch Park East. This parish was carved out of Holy Trinity in 1922. It began as a mission church in Elizabeth Road, which runs from the seafront to Southchurch Park.

Rail
Southchurch is served by Southend East railway station. In 2004, following a campaign by local residents, traders, and some local councillors, the station signs were amended to read "Southend East for Southchurch Village".

Sports
Southchurch is home to Southend Sunday Division team Bellevue Wanderers Football Club, Essex Senior Football League team Southend Manor and Southend Sceptre League team Southchurch AFC.

Southchurch Park is the home venue of Southend-on-Sea and EMT Cricket Club.

Demography
At the 2001 UK census, the Southchurch electoral ward had a population of 9,467. The ethnicity was 96.3% white, 2.6% Asian, 0.7% mixed race, 0.3% black and 0.1% other.

The place of birth of residents was 94.9% United Kingdom, 0.6% Republic of Ireland, 0.9% other Western European countries, and 3.6% elsewhere.

Religion was recorded as 68.9% Christian, 2.1% Jewish, 0.9% Hindu, 0.2% Buddhist, 0.2% Sikh, and 1% Muslim, with 17.3% having no religion, 0.3% having an alternative religion, and 9.2% who did not state their religion.

The economic activity of residents aged 16–74 was 32.6% in full-time employment, 20.4% retired, 12.6% in part-time employment, 9.5% looking after home or family, 8.9% self-employed, 4.8% permanently sick or disabled, 3.4% students without jobs, 2.8% unemployed, 2% students with jobs, and 3% economically inactive for other reasons.

The industry of employment of residents was 15.6% retail, 13.9% finance, 13.9% real estate, 10% health and social work, 9.5% manufacturing, 7.9% construction, 6.7% education, 6.4% transport and communications, 6.2% public administration, 3% hotels and restaurants, 0.8% agriculture, and 6.1% other. Compared with national figures, the ward had a relatively high proportion of workers in finance and construction.

Of the ward's residents aged 16–74, 12.3% had a higher education qualification or the equivalent, compared with 19.9% nationwide.

According to Office for National Statistics estimates, during the period of April 2004 to March 2005 the average gross weekly income of households was £560, compared with an average of £650 in South East England.

Gallery

References

Populated coastal places in Essex
Former civil parishes in Essex
Southend-on-Sea (town)